Andrew U. Frank (born February 3, 1948) was a Swiss-Austrian professor for geoinformation at Vienna University of Technology from 1992 until 2016. Previously he was Professor at the University of Maine at Orono. Frank was recognized for his achievements in the fields of spatial information theory, spatial database theory, and ontology in GIS in a special section in his honor in IJGIS.

Career
He established a theory based course in Geographic Information Science in 1982 at the University of Maine at Orono and was the lead for the Maine participation in the winning proposal for the National Center for Geographic Information and Analysis where he served from 1988 onwards as Associate Director and lead the operations at University of Maine. In 1992 he was appointed to the chair in Geoinformation at Vienna University of Technology. In 2016 he became emeritus professor at the same institution.

Education
 Ph.D., Geodesy, ETH Zürich, 1982
 Dipl.Ing., Kulturingenieur, ETH Zürich, 1978

Scholarship

Data storage and query languages for Geographic Data
The results of Frank's Ph.D. thesis were published in 1981 as "Application of DBMS to land information systems" in the Very Large Database Conference and in the following year as "MAPQUERY: Data Base Query Language for Retrieval of Geometric Data and their Graphical Representation". From this line of research resulted eventually "Towards a Spatial Query Language: User Interface Considerations" (with Max J. Egenhofer) published 1988 again in VLDB and the DE-9IM standard.

Spatial Theory and Spatial Languages
He organized with David M. Mark the NATO financed conference "Cognitive and Linguistic Aspects of Geographic Space" in Las Navas del Marqués.

He published two articles "Qualitative spatial reasoning about distances and directions in geographic space" and "Qualitative spatial reasoning: Cardinal directions as an example".

Ontology for GIS
Together with Sabine Timpf he published "Multiple representations for cartographic objects in a multi-scale tree—An intelligent graphical zoom" and refined the ideas to "Tiers of ontology and consistency constraints in geographical information systems". With Peter A. Burrough he edited a book collecting contributions on "Geographic Objects with Indeterminate Boundaries".

Land Tenure
Andrew Frank was involved in a number of international cadastral projects, most importantly a project funded by the U.S. AID to introduce a cadastre in Ecuador.

Advisees
Andrew Frank "has supervised nearly 40 PhD students, many of whom are now leaders in GIScience", among others:
Yvan Bédard (Prof. em., Laval University; first advisor Earl F. Epstein)
Max Egenhofer (Prof. of Geoinformation, University of Maine)
Alenka Krek Poplin (Prof., Iowa State University)
Sabine Timpf (Prof. of Geography, University of Augsburg)
Martin Raubal (Prof. for Geoinformation-Engineering, ETH Zürich, and Prof. of Geography, University of California, Santa Barbara)
Thomas Bittner (Prof. of Geography, University at Buffalo)

Further Ph.D. students of the recent years include:
Farid Karimipour: A Formal Approach to Implement Dimension Independent Spatial Analyses
Rizwan Bulbul: AHD: Alternate Hierarchical Decomposition Towards LoD Based Dimension Independent Geometric Modeling
Franz-Benjamin Mocnik: A Scale-Invariant Spatial Graph Model
Paul Weiser: A Pragmatic Communication Model for Way-finding Instructions

Frank guided through habilitation:
Werner Kuhn (Prof., University of California, Santa Barbara) 
Stephan Winter (Prof. of Geomatics, University of Melbourne)
Takeshi Shirabe (Lecturer of Geoinformation, Royal Institute of Technology, Stockholm)

Services
Andrew Frank was one of the initial team to bring together the winning proposal for the 1988 award to the National Center for Geographic Information and Analysis, under the lead of David S. Simonnet and together with Mike Goodchild, Ross McKinnon, David M. Mark and others. He served as Associate Director of the National Center for Geographic Information and Analysis and lead the operations at the University of Maine.

In 1992 he organized the Conference on Spatial Information Theory in Pisa, known as COSIT 0  and then the first COSIT in 1993 on the Island of Elba. This conference has been continued as a biannual meeting with proceedings published by Springer in LNCS.

At the Vienna University of Technology he served as head of the institute for Geoinformation till it merged into the new department of Geodesy and Geoinformation. He was deputy to the chair of the senate of the Vienna University of Technology from 2013 till 2016.

He served on the editorial board of several Journals in his field: 
IJGIS International Journal of Geographical Information Science 
JOSIS Journal of Spatial Information Science
Spatial Cognition & Computation

Honors
 Commander's Cross II-nd class (Großes Silbernes Ehrenzeichen) awarded by the President of the Republic of Austria , 2004
 Honorary Doctor of Science, University of Debrecen, 2008.
 Waldo Tobler Distinguished Lecture in GIScience 2012 
 Festschrift on occasion of his 60th birthday 
 Special section in honor of Andrew U. Frank in International Journal of Geographical Information Science, edited by Stephan Winter, Max Egenhofer, Werner Kuhn (scientist) and Martin Raubal

References

Further reading

External links
Andrew U. Frank's homepage at TU Wien
Andrew U. Frank's new homepage
COSIT homepage

1948 births
Living people
ETH Zurich alumni
Scientists from Bern
Academic staff of TU Wien
Geographic information scientists